Mitta Airport is a small Australian rural airport which serves the town of Mitta Mitta in Victoria's northeast.
The 910m gravel runway is parallel to the Omeo Highway  4km north of Mitta Mitta. The airport is used by air ambulances, pilot training flights, fire fighting and for visitors to the area.

==

Pilot Information
The airfield was originally established to support the construction of the Dartmouth Dam and is available for public use with prior approval.
The airfield is located 4kms to the north of Mitta Mitta parallel to the Omeo Highway.
The Mitta Airfield Designator is YITT.

Airfield and weather details

References

External links
 Airport information for pilots

See also
 List of airports in Victoria (Australia)

Airports in Victoria (Australia)